William Lewis Carpenter (January 13, 1844 at Dunkirk, Chautauqua County, New York – July 10, 1898 at Madison Barracks, Jefferson County, New York) was a U.S. Army Officer, naturalist and a geologist who helped document the minerals and resources of the Black Hills of South Dakota which inadvertently led to the Great Sioux War of 1876.

Early career
During the American Civil War he served as a Midshipman in the U.S. Navy from 1861–1864. Wanting to see more action, he resigned from the Navy and joined the Army. He became a private in Battery "D"  2nd Artillery on July 29, 1864. He transferred to Battery "L" September 25, 1865. He served at the Siege of Petersburg, Virginia and with the Army of the Potomac.  He made Corporal on September 28, 1866 and Sergeant on January 29, 1867.

After publication of several scientific articles, ranging in topic from naturalist to geological surveys, he was appointed a Second Lieutenant in the U.S. Army on April 5, 1867. He was assigned to the 9th Infantry Regiment and encouraged to continue his scientific research on the frontier.

Black Hills duty

In 1872–1874 as part of the 9th Infantry Regiment, Second Lieutenant Carpenter documented in a series of reports information of minerals, including gold, being seized from illegal miners and trespassers who were being ejected (See: Fort Laramie Treaty of 1868) from the Black Hills of South Dakota.

Carpenter was promoted to First Lieutenant for "exceptional duties" on December 31, 1873. His and other reports lead to Custer's 1874 Black Hills Expedition that set out on July 2, 1874 and returned on August, 30, 1874.  Listed as "Bill Louis (sic) carpenter"  he briefed naturalist George Bird Grinnell and others for that expedition.

In 1875, Lt. Carpenter, under Colonel Richard Irving Dodge became part of the 1875 Newton-Jenney Party which was a scientific expedition sponsored by the United States Geological Survey to map the Black Hills of South Dakota. Lt. W. Carpenter was commended for his "exceptional diligence and scientific assistance" and that he "contributed greatly" to the 1880 Black Hills Geological report.

In 1876, Carpenter was recorded as a participant in the Battle of the Rosebud in Montana Territory on June 17, 1876 as First Lieutenant of Company G, 9th Infantry, in which 1,200 cavalrymen under General George Crook supported by 300 Crow (Absaroke) and Shoshone warriors were attacked by about 1,500 Sioux and Cheyenne warriors under Chief Crazy Horse.

Carpenter was second in command of Company G, 9th Infantry Regiment who was documented as "awaiting reinforcements after the Battle of the Rosebud" on June 20, 1876.

In 1877, under orders from General Philip Sheridan (later in 1883, Commanding General of the United States Army), Lt. William Lewis Carpenter made his final report on the "Geology and Natural History of the Big Horn Mountains."  This report provided the economic reasons of the land and gold rush into the Black Hills of South Dakota 1873–1877, and was well received by the scientific community. Nominated by geologist W. P. Jenney, who encouraged him to go into academics, William L. Carpenter was elected a "Fellow" of the American Association for the Advancement of Science on September 4, 1877.

In 1880 he was enumerated in the U.S. federal census as a soldier in the unorganized territory of Nebraska.  In 1882 he was listed as an officer of the Department of the Platte: "First Lieut. W. L. Carpenter, Ninth Infantry, Company B, Fort Niobrara."

His later duties included scientific collections and observations.

Later career

Carpenter was promoted to Captain in 1887.

In 1892, after 37 years of service in the Civil War and Indian Wars, the 9th Infantry Regiment was transferred to routine garrison duty in Madison Barracks, New York.

In Feb 1894, Captain Carpenter was at Madison Barracks where he was appointed to serve on an Army court-martial: "A general court-martial is appointed to meet at Madison Barracks, New York, on Feb. 21, 1894. Detail...William L. Carpenter, Ninth Infantry..."  The 9th Infantry's official 1909 history includes several mentions of his service.

Personal

Carpenter was the son of William Lewis Carpenter (Senior) (born July 17, 1813 in Batavia, New York, died in 1867) and Mamie Frances Bristol (born about 1813). He was the only son of three children.  His immigrant ancestry is from the Rehoboth Carpenter family through William Carpenter (born 1605 in England).

On March 12, 1878 Carpenter married Ann Curtis Steever, who was born ca. 1844 in New York. They had one child, a son, Marsh Steever Carpenter, born in 1883.  In 1897 Carpenter joined the District of Columbia chapter of the Sons of the American Revolution.  After his death from Bright's Disease on July 10, 1898 at Madison Barracks, his widow was appointed postmistress of Fort Myer, Arlington County, Virginia in 1899 as cited in The Washington Post, May 24, 1899: "Mrs. W. L. Carpenter, widow of the late Capt. Carpenter, Ninth United States Infantry, has been appointed postmistress at Fort Myer, Va. The office was sought for by numerous candidates, but Fourth Assistant Postmaster General Bristow decided to give the plum to Mrs. Carpenter. Her late husband died at Madison Barracks, N.Y., on July 10, 1898, after an illness of several months. He had a long record of honorable service, extending over more than thirty years."  A detailed obituary issued as a military order is reproduced on pp. 848–849 in "The Carpenter Memorial".  He and his wife are interred in Arlington National Cemetery.

See also

References

1844 births
1898 deaths
American geologists
Black Hills
Deaths from nephritis
American naturalists
People from Dunkirk, New York
Sons of the American Revolution
Union Army officers
United States Army officers
United States Navy midshipmen
Scientists from New York (state)
Union Navy officers